Megapomus is a genus of prehistoric lobe-finned fish which lived during the Carboniferous period.

References 

Prehistoric lobe-finned fish genera
Carboniferous bony fish
Megalichthyiforms